All Is Forgiven is a 2007 French drama film written and directed by Mia Hansen-Løve in her directorial debut. It was screened in the Directors' Fortnight section of the 2007 Cannes Film Festival. It won the Louis Delluc Prize for Best First Film. It was also nominated for the César Award for Best First Feature Film at the 2008 César Awards.

Plot
Victor (Paul Blain), is a Frenchman living in Austria with his wife, Annette, and their six-year-old daughter Pamela. Victor is aimless, working infrequently as a teacher and a writer. He begins to use drugs and drink at night. Eventually Annette moves to Paris hoping it will cure Victor of his depression but his drug use becomes more frequent and he becomes abusive.

After separating from Annette, Victor begins an affair with Gisèle, a fellow drug-addict. When she overdoses he is finally inspired to seek treatment. While visiting Victor in rehab Annette reveals that she cannot forgive him and that she is taking Pamela with her to Caracas and asks him to never contact her again.

Eleven years later Pamela receives a message from her paternal aunt, Martine. Against her mother's wishes she contacts her and learns her father never left Paris and her mother has blocked all attempts at communication between him and Pamela.

The two are able to meet a handful of times before Pamela goes on vacation. However, before she can return, Victor dies abruptly.

His last letter to her contains several poems, including one in German which Pamela later translates for her friend that is on loss and rebirth.

Cast
 Paul Blain as Victor 
 Marie-Christine Friedrich as Annette 
 Victoire and Constance Rousseau as Pamela 
 Carole Franck as Martine
 Olivia Ross as Gisèle
 Alice Langlois as Judith
 Pascal Bongard as André
 Éleonore Rousseau as Alix
 Claude Duneton as le grand-père
 Alice Meiringer as Karine
 Katrin Daliot as Agnès
 Elena Fischer-Dieskau as Nektar

References

External links 
 

2007 films
2007 drama films
2000s French-language films
French drama films
Films directed by Mia Hansen-Løve
Louis Delluc Prize winners
2007 directorial debut films
2000s French films